is a Japanese manga series written and illustrated by Yu Yagami. The plot revolves around three travellers, the eponymous "Elf Hunters", and the elven sorceress Mistress Celcia. The anime was released in North America on VHS and DVD by ADV Films and later re-released by Sentai Filmworks.

On June 12, 2015, the Chinese Ministry of Culture listed Those Who Hunt Elves among 38 anime and manga titles banned in China.

Plot
Elf Hunters seek five spell fragments that have been placed on the skin of elves, similar to tattoos, throughout the magical world they have been transported to. When they find them, they will be able to return to Japan.

The Elf Hunters travel by means of a Type 74 tank, which has been transported to the magical world with them.

The reaction of various elves as the team attempts to strip them naked is a primary basis for much of the show's humor, and are more ridiculous than suggestive. The series is also known for breaking the fourth wall, mostly from Junpei.

Characters

Elf Hunters

A 19-year-old Karateka & strongman with incredible fighting ability, Junpei is the muscle of the group as well as being the only male in the group. However, his rather rough way of saying things as well as his eye for beautiful women get him into trouble more often than not. He is constantly arguing with Celcia and obsessed about curry and, briefly, heliocentrism. Junpei abhors fantasy stories and might be atheist or agnostic. He is infatuated with Airi but is clueless to Celcia's own feelings for him as well despite their constant bickering. Junpei carries a wallet filled with membership cards from various dojos, and a condom with the words "Use with Airi Only!" written on the wrapper.

A 16-year-old high school girl and military otaku. She's a tomboy but not to the point where she loses her femininity. She drives and maintains the tank (to which she has a strong attachment) and also acts as a sniper from time to time; she often sets landmines and booby traps. Despite her love of modern military hardware, Ritsuko also displays a more sensitive and innocent side: she falls in love with the cute Pichi and maintained a belief in Father Christmas long after her peers had abandoned it and is also frightened to death of ghosts. Over the course of the manga, she gradually falls in love with Junpei. Ritsuko carries a Howa Type 64 Battle Rifle, SIG SG 550 assaut rifle, SIG P226 semiautomatic pistol, Heckler & Koch USP, G36 Assault Rifle, PSG1 Sniper Rifle, a sheath knife, some C4 and a Colt M16A2 Assault Rifle. She also speaks fluent English and German.

A 24-year-old Japanese-American talented actress, Airi is as skilled as she is beautiful. Able to cut from one emotion to another in an instant, and even disguise herself as someone else, Airi's talents come in useful for getting out of sticky situations that require trickery rather than brute force. Airi also has an ability to quickly and accurately assess any given situation and to plan for its eventual outcome. Although aware of Junpei's blatant affections for her, she does not reciprocate (although she does use them to her advantage, for example when getting Junpei to volunteer to be live bait to catch a giant shark by saying "Pretty please"). Airi carries a katana and a make-up compact kit.

 for Season 1 and Shelley Calene-Black (English) for Season 2
The unfortunate elf who happens to get tied up with her world's new visitors, Celcia offers to transport Junpei and the others back with a spell, but gets distracted in the process and causes her spell book pages to be spread out all over the world. She is a bit of a ditz and a bit psychotic and is constantly at odds with Junpei, but she is just as determined to get him and his friends back to their own world as they are – even despite her own feelings for Junpei (who she's actually in love with but publicly butts heads with). Generally, she wants them to get back home because they tend to cause a LOT of trouble. During the efforts to retrieve the spell fragments, Celcia displays an uncanny knack for getting stuck in animal form – first as a dog (Pochi), into which she'd willingly transformed, and secondly into a panda. The reason for her retention of these forms is that it is she who recovers spell fragments from the bodies of other elves, only for them to become cloven to her. Unfortunately, if they become cloven to her while she is in another form, it traps her in that form. Also, some of these marks are rather annoying. One, for instance, is a goofy looking black eye; another gives her a set of whiskers.

 for Season 1 Eps. 5 -9 and Christopher Bourque (English) Season 1 Eps. 10-12, Tiffany Grant (English) for Season 2
The Type 74 tank is possessed during the show by the spirit of a cat known as Mihke. Mihke is first met by Elf Hunters possessing a giant teddy bear, which is then attacked by villagers, who explain that the spirit has been harassing them for some time. Upon the destruction of the bear, the spirit possesses a toy dog, found floating in a river by Ritsuko, before this too is destroyed.

A small, white, teddy bear-like interdimensional creature with the ability to produce toilet paper, to whom Ritsuko takes a liking. Pichi ends up proving an incentive for the group, especially due to a plot involving a scarcity of toilet tissue.

Supporting

A priestly elf and acolyte of Celcia who often appears during the group's adventures. Early in the series, she loses her faith and trust in Celcia for she thought she'd betrayed the elven race for helping out Those Who Hunt Elves and sought to stop TWHE by using a powerful spell, but ended up opening a portal and bringing more earth-originated material through. Subsequently, she ended up stripped naked and flowing down a river attached to a log. Despite this, she is later seen as a major supporter of Elf Hunters efforts to return to Japan. Probably because this is the best way to stop them.

Voiced by: Motomu Kiyokawa (Japanese), Bob Elliott (English) for Season 1 and Rob Bundy for Season 2

 for Season 1 and Randy Sparks (English) for Season 2
They are the two Elven Bishops, with whom Annette and Celcia often consort and often disagree.

An elven wind-priestess. She initially mistakes TWHE as the Legendary Trio when Hammerhead and his pirate crew raid her village.
Andy

An inhabitant of Emily's village.
Bronco

Andy's younger brother.
Hammerhead

Leader of a group of anthropomorphic sea creatures who hunt elves to sell as stuffed hunting trophies. They prove to be no match for Junpei's fighting skills, Ritsuko's weaponry and the T-74 Tank's gun.
Gabriella

An Amazon-like female elf. Her forces would be effortlessly defeated by Those Who Hunt Elves and she herself would fall to Junpei. After which she develops feelings for him for his honor as a fighter.
Dihal

A female elf and leader of a town beset by skeletal warriors, she drinks a magic potion which causes her to grow, thus enabling Elf Hunters to search her naked frame. She spends the rest of the episodes in her giant form.
Rapier

A female elf and accomplished fighter, cursed with the numbers of her defeated rivals on her back. It can't come off until she's defeated her 1,000th opponent. She would fall to Junpei but was relieved of her curse because she learned the true way of the fist that her late sensei taught her but refused to listen. She thanks him and Junpei for relieving her of the curse.
Sister Romina

An elven nun.
Emmy

A ghostly elf who claims to be a lesbian to keep Junpei from stripping her.
Pierre

Born-again ex-alcoholic hotelier.
Colleena

An elf who works in flower delivery.
Grace

A human dressmaker.

An elf cursed to eternally wear a magical suit of armor she donned in order to protect her city from an evil giant. After a few comical attempts by TWHE to strip her of the armor, she finally manages to remove it, only to put it back on again.
Milliea's Grandfather

A short, shriveled-up elf who is also a pervert who holds an antidote for Millia's armor to come off.

 for Season 1 and Jay Hickman (English) for Season 2
The chief elven prosecutor for the world in which Elf Hunters find themselves. He is often looking for ways to end the heroes' reign of terror.

 for Season 1 and Monica Rial (English) for Season 2
A female elf presiding judge who heard the case against Elf Hunters, only to award them a license to keep stripping elves as a means to return home.
Rosa

Mermaid elf leader.
Lana

Elven thief.
Nancy

A healer who has become a recluse after being inflicted with spell fragments.
Dr. Bruno

A scientist and astronomer, developing her father's heliocentric theories, much to the chagrin of the astronomical council. However, her theories are very different from the normal scientific definition.
Beano

Mr. Tomato
Voiced by: Donaldo (English)
They are two island-based botanists whose experiments with increasing plant growth exponentially end in conflagration.
Lilia

An elf who plays the part of a ditsy schoolgirl in a scenario invented by the Judge to entrap Elf Hunters.
Mr. Wolf

A wolf who bears a grudge against humanity after the death of his parents. His plans are thwarted by Elf Hunters, who later save him from four elven hunters.
Grandma

Grandmother of Little Red Riding Hood.
Elven Hunters
Voiced by: 1. Jessica Boone {English) 2. Kathya Coker (English) 3. Kim Prause (English) 4. Melissa Williams (English}
Four psychopathic hunters who are eventually shown as female elves.
Pulana

An elf bearing an enchanted Chinese-style dress. She is rescued by Junpei and Ritsuko from the Friskers.
The Friskers
The Chairman

Leader of the Friskers, a group who pride themselves on being the primary stripping faction in the Elf Hunters' fantasy world. Ironically, they worship TWHE as the premiere elf strippers.
Bunny Mask

Mary the Shepherd

Man Who Stripped the Emperor

There are several Father Christmases in the world in which Elf Hunters find themselves, including Satan, Infomercial and Salary Man Santas, as well as several female Santas – including Annette. There is also a Dog Santa.
Satan Santa

Infomercial Santa
Voiced by: Vic Mignogna (English)
Salary Man Santas
Voiced by: 1. Chris Patton (English) 2. Andy McAvin (English)
Regina

A powerful elven sorceress residing in Treetown, who firstly attempts to lure Elf Hunters into becoming human sacrifices by a trick, in order to save her world from destruction at the hands of the Legendary Sorcerer (subsequently ending up stripped), before imploring their aid when her fears become reality.
Mayor of Treetown

Helping Regina with her plans.
Bizarre

An elven master thief with plans for global domination. She is aided by two goblins.
Goblin 1

Goblin 2

Legendary Sorcerer

Having lain dormant for many years under Treetown, the sorcerer has the power to destroy the world.

Media

Manga
The manga was written and illustrated by Yu Yagami. It was serialized by MediaWorks in the manga magazine Dengeki Comic Gao! from June 1995 to March 2003, and collected in 21 bound volumes. It is licensed in English by ADV Manga, with only the first seven volumes published in English in 2004, before the series went on indefinite hiatus. ADV's website makes no mention of the series in manga form, so it is unlikely the series will be continued.

Anime
Two anime series were created. Both were animated by Group TAC and produced by Amuse, Inc., while the second was also produced by Project E2. Both series were licensed by ADV Films, who released as 4 DVDs. In 2009 Sentai Filmworks released the series in a complete collection set.

{|class="wikitable" style="width:100%; margin:auto; background:#FFF;"
|-
! colspan="3" style="background:#CCF;" | Those Who Hunt Elves
|-
! colspan="3" style="background:#c0c0c0;text-align:left;" | Volume 1 - Ready, Set, Strip!
|-
! width="30" | # !! Title !! width="150" | Original air date

|-
! colspan="3" style="background:#c0c0c0;text-align:left;" | Volume 2 - Elf Stripping For Fun and Profit

|}

{|class="wikitable" style="width:100%; margin:auto; background:#FFF;"
|-
! colspan="3" style="background:#CCF;" | Those Who Hunt Elves 2
|-
! colspan="3" style="background:#c0c0c0;text-align:left;" | Volume 3 - Forgive Me for Stripping You
|-
! width="30" | # !! Title !! width="150" | Original air date

|-
! colspan="3" style="background:#c0c0c0;text-align:left;" | Volume 4 - Still Stripping After All These Years

|}

Music
Those Who Hunt Elves
Opening Theme:
"Angel Blue"
Lyrics by: Naoko Hamasaki
Composition and arrangement by: Chihiro Kiryu
Song by: Naoko Hamasaki

Ending Theme:
"The Genius Comes At The End" (天才は最後にやってくる; Tensai wa Saigo ni Yattekuru)
Lyrics by: Natsumi Tadano
Composition and arrangement by: Hideki Tsutsumi
Song by: Naoko Hamasaki

Those Who Hunt Elves 2
Opening Theme:
"Round11"
Lyrics by: Naoko Hamasaki
Composition and arrangement by: Chihiro Kiryu
Song by: Naoko Hamasaki

Ending Theme:
"To a Place Beyond Miracles" (奇跡の向こう側へ; Kiseki no Mukou Soba e)
Lyrics by: Naoko Hamasaki
Composition and arrangement by: Hideki Tsutsumi
Song by: Naoko Hamasaki

References

Further reading

External links
J-pop.com review

1995 manga
2007 manga
2013 manga
1996 anime television series debuts
1997 anime television series debuts
ADV Films
ADV Manga
Adventure anime and manga
ASCII Media Works manga
TV Tokyo original programming
Censored television series
Comedy anime and manga
Comic Meteor manga
Dengeki Comic Gao!
Group TAC
Japanese webcomics
Sentai Filmworks
Shōnen manga
Television censorship in China
Webcomics in print
Works banned in China
Elves in popular culture
Isekai anime and manga